The Laudario di Cortona (Cortona, Biblioteca del Comune e dell'Accademia Etrusca, Ms. 91) is a musical codex from the second half of the 13th century containing a collection of laude.

Works

Works found in other manuscripts
ANT – Antwerp, Museum Mayer van den Bergh 303 (Solo testo) 
ARE – Laudario di Arezzo (Arezzo, Biblioteca Comunale 180 della Fraternità dei Laici) (Solo testo)
M18 – Laudario Magliabechiano 18 (Firenze, Biblioteca Nazionale Centrale, Magliabechiano II I 122, Banco Rari 18) (con notazione musicale)
M19 – Laudario Magliabechiano 19 (Firenze, Biblioteca Nazionale Centrale, Magliabechiano II I 212, Banco Rari 19) (Solo testo)
CBC – Firenze, Carlo Bruscoli Collection (Solo testo)
MIL – Laudario di Milano (Milano, Biblioteca Trivulziana 535) (Solo testo)
NY – New York, Robert Lehman Collection (anticamente Smith Collection, Worcester, Mass.) (Solo testo)
W15 – Washington, National Gallery of Art, Rosenwald Collection B-15, 393 (Solo testo)
W22 – Washington, National Gallery of Art, Rosenwald Collection B-22, 128 (Solo testo)

References

Medieval Italy
Medieval music manuscript sources
Cortona